DCNS may refer to:
 DCNS (company), French industrial group specialised in naval defence and energy
 Deputy Chief of Naval Staff (Australia)
 Deputy Chief of the Naval Staff (India)
 Deputy Chief of the Naval Staff (Pakistan)
 Deputy Chief of the Naval Staff (United Kingdom), Royal Navy